Kualanamu International Airport Station (KNM) is an airport railway station located in Kualanamu International Airport complex, in Beringin, Beringin, Deli Serdang Regency, North Sumatra, Indonesia. The station is only about 50 meters from the airport building. This station is currently serving Kualanamu Airport Rail Link trips to Medan Station.

This station has only two tracks. However, the station is classified as large class station, with the leadership of Kepala Stasiun Besar (KSB), Vice-KSB and aided dispatcher (Regulatory Train Journey). This station has three platforms. Platforms 1 and 3 are used for passengers arriving from Medan, while the second platform is used for passengers leaving for Medan Station. This station is operated by Railink, and is the first airport railway station in Indonesia.

Services
The following is a list of train services at the Kualanamu International Airport Station.

Passenger services
Airport Rail Link
Kualanamu Airport Rail Link, towards

References

External links

Railway stations in North Sumatra
Railway stations opened in 2013
Airport railway stations in Indonesia
2013 establishments in Indonesia
Kualanamu International Airport